Hayburn Wyke railway station was a railway station on the Scarborough & Whitby Railway, 7 miles from Scarborough. It opened on 16 July 1885, and served the popular local beauty spot of Hayburn Wyke, and the Hayburn Wyke Hotel. The platform was originally on the up side of the line, but was moved to the down side on request of the NER.

The station was rebuilt in 1893, and closed temporarily on 1 March 1917. Reopening took place on 2 May 1921 before final, permanent closure on 8 March 1965. From 1955 the station was reduced to an unstaffed halt. The former stationmaster's house dating back to 1892, which stands parallel to the former line, survives as a private residence.

References

Sources

External links

 Hayburn Wyke station on navigable 1947 O. S. map

Disused railway stations in the Borough of Scarborough
Former North Eastern Railway (UK) stations
Beeching closures in England
Railway stations in Great Britain opened in 1885
Railway stations in Great Britain closed in 1917
Railway stations in Great Britain opened in 1921
Railway stations in Great Britain closed in 1965